Mussurana bicolor, the two-colored mussurana, is a species of snake in the family Colubridae. The species is native to southern South America.

Geographic range
M. bicolor is found in Argentina, southern Brazil, Paraguay, and Peru.

Habitat
The preferred natural habitats of M. bicolor are grassland, savanna, and forest.

Description
Adults are gray or brown dorsally, and ivory ventrally. Juveniles are brick red dorsally, with a black vertebral stripe.

Reproduction
M. bicolor is oviparous.

References

Further reading
Freiberg M (1982). Snakes of South America. Hong Kong: T.F.H. Publications. 189 pp. . (Clelia bicolor, p. 92).
Peracca MG (1904). "Nouvelles espèces d'Ophidiens d'Asie et d'Amerique, faisante parte de la collection du Museum d'histoire naturelle de Genève ". Revue Suisse de Zoologie 12: 663–668. (Oxyrhopus bicolor, new species, pp. 667–668). (in French).
Peters JA, Orejas-Miranda B (1970). Catalogue of the Neotropical Squamata. Part I. Snakes. (With the collaboration of Roberto Donoso-Barros). United States National Museum Bulletin 297. Washington, District of Columbia: Smithsonian Institution Press. viii + 347 pp. (Clelia bicolor, new combination, p. 63). (in English and Spanish).
Zaher, Hussam; Grazziotin, Felipe Gobbi; Cadle, John E.; Murphy, Robert W.; de Moura-Leite, Julio Cesar; Bonatto, Sandro L. (2009). "Molecular phylogeny of advanced snakes (Serpentes, Caenophidia) with an emphasis on South American Xenodontines: a revised classification and descriptions of new taxa". Papéis Avulsos de Zoologia 49 (11): 115–153. (Mussurana bicolor, new combination). (in English, with abstracts in English and Portuguese).

Mussuranas
Mussurana (genus)
Snakes of South America
Reptiles described in 1904
Reptiles of Argentina
Reptiles of Brazil
Reptiles of Peru
Reptiles of Paraguay
Taxa named by Mario Giacinto Peracca